Taupiri is a small town of about 500 people on the eastern bank of the Waikato River in the Waikato District of New Zealand. It is overlooked by Taupiri mountain, the sacred burial ground for the Waikato tribes of the Māori people, located just to the north.

Taupiri is located near the northern end of the Waikato Basin immediately south of the junction of the Mangawara Stream (which drains the northern part of the basin) and the Waikato River. The Waikato River then flows northward through the Taupiri Gorge between the Hakarimata Range to the south and the Taupiri Range to the north, into the Lower Waikato.

The North Island Main Trunk railway line runs through the town and the gorge, linking Huntly 8 kilometres to the north and Ngāruawāhia 7 kilometres to the south.  also ran through the town until the Huntly Bypass opened in March 2020.

Demographics
Taupiri is part of the larger Taupiri-Lake Kainui statistical area.

Taupiri had a population of 492 at the 2018 New Zealand census, an increase of 72 people (17.1%) since the 2013 census, and an increase of 48 people (10.8%) since the 2006 census. There were 183 households, comprising 243 males and 243 females, giving a sex ratio of 1.0 males per female, with 93 people (18.9%) aged under 15 years, 96 (19.5%) aged 15 to 29, 216 (43.9%) aged 30 to 64, and 87 (17.7%) aged 65 or older.

Ethnicities were 74.4% European/Pākehā, 40.2% Māori, 4.3% Pacific peoples, 1.8% Asian, and 1.2% other ethnicities. People may identify with more than one ethnicity.

Although some people chose not to answer the census's question about religious affiliation, 50.6% had no religion, 31.7% were Christian, 1.8% had Māori religious beliefs, 0.6% were Hindu and 3.0% had other religions.

Of those at least 15 years old, 33 (8.3%) people had a bachelor's or higher degree, and 123 (30.8%) people had no formal qualifications. 45 people (11.3%) earned over $70,000 compared to 17.2% nationally. The employment status of those at least 15 was that 174 (43.6%) people were employed full-time, 48 (12.0%) were part-time, and 42 (10.5%) were unemployed.

Taupiri-Lake Kainui statistical area
Taupiri-Lake Kainui statistical area extends southeast towards Horsham Downs. Since the 2018 census, the boundaries of Ngāruawāhia have enlarged to include some of this area. At the 2018 Census, Taupiri-Lake Kainui covered .

Taupiri-Lake Kainui had a population of 2,220 at the 2018 New Zealand census, an increase of 285 people (14.7%) since the 2013 census, and an increase of 468 people (26.7%) since the 2006 census. There were 753 households, comprising 1,131 males and 1,092 females, giving a sex ratio of 1.04 males per female. The median age was 38.8 years (compared with 37.4 years nationally), with 492 people (22.2%) aged under 15 years, 408 (18.4%) aged 15 to 29, 1,059 (47.7%) aged 30 to 64, and 264 (11.9%) aged 65 or older.

Ethnicities were 76.9% European/Pākehā, 28.9% Māori, 3.4% Pacific peoples, 3.5% Asian, and 2.3% other ethnicities. People may identify with more than one ethnicity.

The percentage of people born overseas was 11.8, compared with 27.1% nationally.

Although some people chose not to answer the census's question about religious affiliation, 48.1% had no religion, 38.0% were Christian, 2.4% had Māori religious beliefs, 0.5% were Hindu, 0.5% were Buddhist and 2.0% had other religions.

Of those at least 15 years old, 237 (13.7%) people had a bachelor's or higher degree, and 381 (22.0%) people had no formal qualifications. The median income was $33,600, compared with $31,800 nationally. 324 people (18.8%) earned over $70,000 compared to 17.2% nationally. The employment status of those at least 15 was that 912 (52.8%) people were employed full-time, 249 (14.4%) were part-time, and 96 (5.6%) were unemployed.

History and culture

Pre-European history

Until sometime in the 19th century, a large Māori village or town, Kaitotehe, stood on the flat land on the other side of the river, below the Hakarimata Range.

In early years it was the headquarters of Ngāti Mahuta. Te Putu built Taupiri pā on the summit of a spur of Taupiri mountain, in the 17th century. When Te Putu was killed, he was buried at the pā, which thus became tapu (sacred) and was abandoned. Early European travellers in the area were obliged by Māori to cross to the other side of the Waikato River to avoid the sacred area. In the early 19th century, Kaitotehe was the home of Pōtatau Te Wherowhero, the paramount chief of Ngāti Mahuta who became the first Māori King.

Post-European history

Taupiri township was settled by Europeans in the 1870s (a railway station opened in 1877), and became a farming centre, with flax mills and a sawmill. A dairy factory was built in 1921, then a larger one in 1930.

In the 2006 census, 32 per cent of the population were Māori.

Marae 

Taupiri Marae is located in Taupiri. It is a meeting ground for the Waikato Tainui hapū of Ngāti Kuiaarangi, Ngāti Mahuta, Ngāti Tai and Ngāti Whāwhākia, and includes the Pani Ora and Te Puna Tangata meeting houses.

Education

References

Populated places in Waikato
Waikato District
Populated places on the Waikato River